To defy means to challenge or combat.

Defy may refer to:

 Defy Appliances, a South African appliance manufacturer
 Motorola Defy, an Android-based smartphone from Motorola
 Defy (album), a 2018 album by Of Mice & Men
 Defy TV, an American free-to-air television network

See also
 Defy Thirst, an American non-profit organization
 Defi (disambiguation)
 Defiance (disambiguation)
 Defiant (disambiguation)